The Do Braço River is a river of Santa Catarina state in southeastern Brazil, a tributary of the Tijucas River. Some sources treat it as part of the Alto Braço River.

See also
List of rivers of Santa Catarina

References

Rivers of Santa Catarina (state)